Mount Gester is a flat-topped, ice-capped mountain,  high, on the divide between Johnson Glacier and Venzke Glacier in Marie Byrd Land, Antarctica. It stands just south of Mount Kohnen and Bowyer Butte. It was mapped by the United States Geological Survey from surveys and U.S. Navy air photos, 1959–65, and named by the Advisory Committee on Antarctic Names for Lieutenant Ronald L. Gester of the NOAA Corps, a seismologist/geomagnetist at Byrd Station, 1971.

References

Mountains of Marie Byrd Land